Oksana Kurt, also known as Oksana Parkhomenko, (born 28 July 1984 in Baku, Azerbaijan SSR); is a retired Azerbaijani indoor volleyball player, recognized as one of the most successful volleyball players in her country. Kurt is the most capped player in the history of Azerbaijan women's national team and was the team captain from 2006 until 2015. She retired from volleyball in 2015 and works as a volleyball manager.

Clubs
  Nagliyatchi VC (1999–2000)
  Yeşilyurt Istanbul (2000–2001)
  Azerrail Baku (2001–2007)
  Volero Zurich (2007–2007)
  Azerrail Baku (2007–2008)
  Fenerbahçe Istanbul (2008–2009)
  WVC Dynamo Moscow (2009–2011)
  Azeryol Baku (2011–2014)
  Azerrail Baku (2013–2015)

Awards

Individual
 2006 World Championship qualification "Best Setter and Best Server"
 2010 World Championship qualification "Best Blocker"
 2008-09 Turkish Women's Volleyball League "Best Setter"
 2009-10 Russian Cup "Best Setter"

Club
 2001-02 CEV Cup -  Champion, with Azerrail Baku
 2002–03 Azerbaijan Women's Volleyball Super League -  Champion, with Azerrail Baku
 2003–04 Azerbaijan Women's Volleyball Super League -  Champion, with Azerrail Baku
 2004–05 Azerbaijan Women's Volleyball Super League -  Champion, with Azerrail Baku
 2005–06 Azerbaijan Women's Volleyball Super League -  Champion, with Azerrail Baku
 2007 Swiss Women's Volleyball League -  Champion, with Voléro Zürich
 2008-09 Turkish Women's Volleyball League -  Champion, with Fenerbahçe Acıbadem
 2008–09 Women's CEV Cup -  Bronze medal, with Fenerbahçe Acıbadem
 2009-10 Russian Superleague -  Runner-Up, with Dynamo Moscow
 2009-10 Russian Cup -  Champion, with Dynamo Moscow
 2013–14 Azerbaijan Women's Volleyball Super League -  Runner-Up, with Azeryol Baku
 2014–15 Azerbaijan Superleague -  Bronze medal, with Azeryol Baku

See also
Azeryol Baku
Azerbaijan women's national volleyball team

References

External links
 

1984 births
Living people
Sportspeople from Baku
Azerbaijani women's volleyball players
Fenerbahçe volleyballers
European Games competitors for Azerbaijan
Volleyball players at the 2015 European Games
Setters (volleyball)
Azerbaijani people of Ukrainian descent
Expatriate volleyball players in Turkey
Expatriate volleyball players in Switzerland
Expatriate volleyball players in Russia
Azerbaijani expatriate sportspeople in Turkey
Azerbaijani expatriate sportspeople in Switzerland
Azerbaijani expatriate sportspeople in Russia
Yeşilyurt volleyballers